Diphosphagermylenes are a class of compounds containing a divalent germanium atom bound to two phosphorus atoms. While these compounds resemble diamidocarbenes, such as N-heterocyclic carbenes (NHC), diphosphagermylenes display bonding characteristics distinct from those of diamidocarbenes. In contrast to NHC compounds, in which there is effective N-C p(π)-p(π) overlap between the lone pairs of planar nitrogens and an empty p-orbital of a carbene, systems containing P-Ge p(π)-p(π) overlap are rare. Until 2014, the geometry of phosphorus atoms in all previously reported diphosphatetrylenes are pyramidal, with minimal P-Ge p(π)-p(π) interaction. It has been suggested that the lack of p(π)-p(π) in Ge-P bonds is due to the high energetic barrier associated with achieving a planar configuration at phosphorus, which would allow for efficient p(π)-p(π) overlap between the phosphorus lone pair and the empty P orbital of Ge. The resulting lack of π stabilization contributes to the difficulty associated with isolating diphosphagermylene  and the Ge-P double bonds. However, utilization of sterically encumbering phosphorus centers has allowed for the isolation of diphosphagermylenes with a planar phosphorus center with a significant P-Ge p(π)-p(π) interaction.

Preparation of diphosphagermylenes

Synthesis of P-Ge σ-only diphosphagermylenes 
Reactivity of sterically demanding lithium (fluorosilyl)silylphosphanides with GeI2 yields green, cubic crystals in moderate yield. The identity of this species was investigated using only multinuclear NMR, elemental analysis, and UV-vis. Computational calculations (at the CIS level with the ab initio Los Alamos pseudopotential method (LAN L 1 DZ)) of the diphosphagermylene electronic structure was in agreement experimentally-derived electronic transition values. Due to disorder, the crystal structure of the diphosphagermylene could not be investigated.

Synthesis of P-Ge π-stabilized diphosphagermylenes
The sterically encumbered germylene ligand (Dipp)2PH, where Dipp=2,6-iPr2C6H3, was synthesized by the addition of PCl3 to DippLi-(OEt2), followed by the addition of LiAlH4. (Dipp)2PH was added to PhCH2K, which is combined with GeCl2 to provide (Dipp2P)2Ge. The synthesis resulted in dark red crystals suitable for x-ray crystallography. The identity of the compound was confirmed by elemental analysis, multinuclear NMR, and x-ray crystallography. This compound is stable in the absence of air and water.

Structure

P-Ge σ-only system: Driess's diphosphagermylene 
While crystals were formed of Driess's diphosphagermylene, the X-ray structure diphosphagermylene could not be analyzed due to disordering. It has been suggested that the three lone pairs in Driess's diphosphagermylene system are composed of Ge (4s, 4p) and P (3s, 3p) valence orbitals. Driess calculated (MP2/DZ+POL//RHF/DZ+ZPE) the reaction profile for the isomerization of  E(PH2)2 (E = Si, Ge, Sn, Pb) from a σ-only, carbene-like system to a tautomer containing trivalent E with a π bond between E and phosphorus. The authors observed that the carbene-like form is preferred over its tautomer for silicon, germanium, tin, and lead analogues.

P-Ge p(π)-p(π) Stabilized Systems: ((Dipp)2P)2Ge and ((Tripp)2P)2Ge 

P-substituted heavier group 14 analogues (Si, Ge, Sn, Pb) of diaminocarbenes are less established. It has been suggested this is due to a high energetic barrier associated with achieving a planar configuration at phosphorus, which would enable p(π)-p(π) overlap between the P lone pair and the empty p orbital of the group 14 center. Differences in donation ability of phosphorus versus nitrogen likely do not play a role in achieving p(π)-p(π) overlap because calculations indicate that the π donor capacity of phosphorus is similar to that of nitrogen. Consequently, all P atoms in reports on diphosphatetrylenes previous to ((Dipp)2P)2Ge contain pyramidal P with Ge-P bonds of exclusively σ character. By utilizing sterically encumbered (Dipp)P ligands, p(π)-p(π) in diphosphagermylene was achieved. This compound crystallizes as discrete monomers and is the first crystallographically characterized diphosphagermylene with a two-coordinate Ge center.

By crystal structure analysis, the bond lengths of the two germanium-phosphorus bonds are 2.2337 Å (P1-Ge) and 2.3823 Å (P2-Ge). While the phosphorus center of P1-Ge is pyramidal, the P2-Ge phosphorus is trigonal planar. Moreover, the planes of P1-Ge-P2 and C-P1-Ge are nearly in coincident.  These results are consistent with multiple bond character between a trigonal planar phosphorus (P1) and Ge.  It has been suggested that only one P of the diphosphagermylene is planar because there is competition between the two phosphorus lone pairs and the empty P orbitals at the Ge center if both phosphorus atoms are planar.  This would result in a weaker P-Ge interaction that would not be sufficient to overcome the energy of planarizing both P atoms.

In addition, ((Dipp)2P)2Ge was modified such that an iPr groups was added to the para position of (Dipp)2P, to make (Tripp)2P. The donating effect of an additional iPr group has little effect on the bonding and structure of the diphosphagermylene.

Solution and solid state nuclear magnetic resonance (NMR)
A single, broad singlet is observed at 3.2 ppm at room temperature in the solution state phosphorus nuclear magnetic resonance (PNMR) of ((Dipp)2P)2Ge. This signal is consistent with rapid exchange between the planar and pyramidal phosphorus centers. As the temperature is reduced to -80 C, the signal becomes two broad, equal intensity singlets at -42.0 ppm and 8.0.

Two peaks with isotropic chemical shifts of 81.9 and -61.6 ppm, in a 1:1 ratio are observed in the solid state PNMR. No other signals are observed in the PNMR. In general diphosphagermylenes with pyramidal phosphorus centers exhibit a chemical shift close to those of free phosphine. In addition, planar phosphorus centers of GeIV=P compounds generally have a downfield PNMR shift. Consequently, peaks at 81.9 and -61.6 ppm have been assigned as planar and pyramidal phosphorus centers of ((Dipp)2P)2Ge, respectively. This has been supported by DFT calculations that predict PNMR shifts of planar and pyramidal phosphorus centers of ((Dipp)2P)2Ge are at 100 and -61 ppm.

Natural bond orbital (NBO) analysis
Natural bond orbital analysis has been carried out on the P-Ge p(π)-p(π) system, ((Dipp)2P)2Ge. Inspection of the molecular orbitals reveals that the HOMO-1 consists of a π orbital, resulting from donation from the planar P lone pair into the empty P orbital of the germylene center. Natural bond orbital analysis reveals that this bond is 77% P-based and 0.3 eV higher in energy than the P-Ge σ bond. In contrast, the lone pair of the pyramidal phosphorus center is essentially sp hybridized and directed away from the germanium center. The germanium lone pair is predominantly s-character. Wiberg bond indices for Ge-P1 and Ge-P2 bonds are 1.33 and 0.89, respectively, which is consistent with a double bond between Ge-P1 and a single bond between Ge-P2.

Atoms in molecules (AIM) analysis 
Atoms in molecules analysis of ((Dipp)2P)2Ge suggests that there is a double bond between P1-Ge. Bond order can be assessed by measuring the ellipticity,  a measure of anisotropic electron density, at the bond critical point.  For example, butane, ethylene, and ethyne have a bond ellipticity of 0.01, 0.30, and 0.00 respectively, which correspond to a single, double, and a triple bond. A bond critical point between P1-Ge with ρ=0.091 and ellipticity 0.297 was observed in ((Dipp)2P)2Ge, consistent with a double bond. . This contrasts ρ=0.083 and ellipticity 0.064 at the bond critical point of P2-Ge in ((Dipp)2P)2Ge. Delocalization index (DI) was also used to predict the bond order of ((Dipp)2P)2Ge. DI values for P1-Ge and P2-Ge were determined to be 1.275 and 0.843, consistent with a P1-Ge double bond and Wiberg bond indices calculated.

References

Germanium(II) compounds
Phosphines
Functional groups